Dunbar is an unincorporated community in Butler County, Kentucky, United States.

Dunbar had a post office with ZIP code 42219. The post office operated from its establishment on April 19, 1898 until its closing on May 13, 2022. Its name is a blend of those of two local families: the Dunns and the Barrows.

Dunbar is home to the Cedar Ridge Speedway.

References

Unincorporated communities in Butler County, Kentucky
Unincorporated communities in Kentucky